Tvøroyri is a village on the north side of the Trongisvágsfjørður on the east coast of Suðuroy island in the Faroe Islands. Together with Froðba, Trongisvágur, Líðin and Øravík it forms Tvøroyri Municipality.

The village is considered to have been founded in 1836, when the Royal Danish Monopoly Trade Store was founded on a small tongue of land, called Tvøroyri. In a short span of years, Tvøroyri grew into a large village, mainly after 1856 when the monopoly state of the store was abolished. Around the turn of the 20th century, Tvøroyri was one of the largest towns on the Faroe Islands and had one of the main fishing industries.

Overview
The church in Tvøroyri was constructed in Norway as a building set, moved to Tvøroyri and then built here in 1907, ready to use in 1908. The old church was moved to Sandvík.

Trongisvágur 
Trongisvágur is the village furthest to the west of the inlet of Trongisvágsfjørður. Trongisvágur is where most of the new residential houses have been built. Trongisvágur is home to the large Sports Centre, the children's institutions and the football stadium "Stórá". Stórá is the home of TB – Tvøroyrar Bóltfelag, the oldest football team of the Faroe Islands. TB  was founded in 1892; the second oldest team was founded in 1904.

Froðba 
The other neighbouring village is called Froðba. It is further east on the north side of the fjord, on the same side as Tvøroyri. Froðba has columnar basalt along the road. The poet Poul F. Joensen had his home in Froðba – there is a monument there to honour him. Froðba and Trongisvágur are older villages than Tvøroyri.

History 
When the monopoly was abolished in 1856, private companies were founded on Tvøroyri. One of these grew into the largest in the Faroe Islands. It had 20 branches and 30 ships. Down by the harbour, north of Seglloftið, lies a square covered by flat stones. Fish used to be dried in the sun here. The Royal Trade Monopoly that had a branch here from 1836 to 1856 built the old houses in the area. The village of Tvøroyri was actually founded due to this branch.
Tvøroyri has a large fillet-factory that initiated its production in 1975.

Transport 
The ferry Smyril M/F has 2-3 daily departures from Tórshavn, it calls at Krambatangi ferry port, which is located on the opposite side of the inlet. The trip from Tórshavn to Tvøroyri takes 2 hours. The ferry takes 200 cars and 975 persons. There are two bus lines in Suðuroy, line 700 goes to the southern part of the island with Sumba as its end station, 701 goes to the northern part of the island, the end stations are in Sandvík, the northernmost village, and in Fámjin, which is on the west coast.

Culture 
Tvøroyri and Vágur take turns in hosting an annual civic-festival called Jóansøka. It can be described as a smaller version of the Ólavsøka held in Tórshavn. Jóansøka runs in late June.
Tvøroyri has a history and maritime museum and an art gallery.

Sports
The sports club TB Tvøroyri was founded in 1892 as a football club, the first in the Faroe Islands. The name TB is also used in volleyball. The club was a branch of TB Tvøroyri, but in 2016 it became an independent club with the name TB Flogbóltur. In December 2016 the three football clubs on the island of Suðuroy, TB, FC Suðuroy and Royn, agreed to merge into one club. The new club will get a new name for the 2018 season, for the 2017 season the name was TB/FC Suðuroy/Royn.

There is a rowing club, Froðbiar Sóknar Róðrarfelag, which was founded in 1934. A swimming club is for the whole island, it is called Susvim or Suðuroyar Svimjifelag.

Notable people  
 Atli Dam, former Faroese prime minister.
 Petur Mohr Dam, former Faroese prime minister.
 Jóannes Eidesgaard, former Faroese prime minister.
 Jacob Haugaard, comedian and Danish former MP.
 Óli Johannesen, former national football player.
 Gilli Rólantsson, footballer

See also 
 List of towns in the Faroe Islands

References

External links 

 Faroeislands.dk: Tvøroyri Images and description of all cities on the Faroe Islands.
 The Municipality of Tvøroyri
 TB - The Football Club of Tvøroyri
 Photo gallery
 Painting Courses in Tvøroyri and Suðuroy
 Art Gallery Oyggin

Populated places in the Faroe Islands
Populated coastal places in the Faroe Islands
Ports and harbours of the Faroe Islands
Suðuroy